Jimmy Britt (October 5, 1879, in San Francisco, California – January 21, 1940) was a boxer from 1902 to 1909.  He fought Joe Gans twice for the World lightweight title but lost both bouts. In a career spanning 23 bouts, Britt met 6 different Hall of Famers for a combined total of 10 fights; going 4-4-2. After retiring from boxing in 1909, Britt toured the United States as a vaudeville performer, then later worked as a WPA superintendent. He died of a heart attack in his San Francisco home on January 21, 1940, and was interred at Holy Cross Cemetery (Colma, California). Britt was elected to the Ring Magazine hall of fame in 1976.

Career

Amateur
In 1901 Jimmy Britt, who was the 135Ib Champion of the Pacific Coast, boxed three rounds with World Featherweight champion Terry McGovern. In this encounter Britt was described as boxing "exceedingly well" by The San Francisco Call.

Early professional fights
In 18 February 1902 Jimmy Britt had his professional debut in a 15-round scheduled fight against Toby Irwin Britt outclassed his opponent over the 15 rounds to win on points. On 19 May 1902, Britt fought former Lightweight Champion Kid Lavigne. Britt outboxed Lavigne throughout the contest until Kid Lavigne's brother stopped the contest to prevent him from taking any more punishment. Lavigne was discovered to have broken bones in his left forearm after the fight, near where they had broken previously.

Britt then fought former Featherweight and Lightweight Champion Frank Erne on November 26, 1902. Britt knocked out his Swiss opponent in the seventh round; he hurt his opponent with a left to the body early in the round, and after sending him down multiple times, stopped him with a left to the stomach. The San Francisco Call described Britt as finishing the fight "unscathed", with Erne "unable to get in an effective blow", while Frank Erne showed all the signs of his punishment, with his nose, lips, and under his left eye swollen.

Britt then fought Young Corbett II, winning a hard-fought decision over 20 rounds. Britt's face was covered in blood in the fifth round and was staggered in the 10th round, while Corbett was helping in the eighth round, and staggered Corbett in the 15th round. However, Britt took over after the 16th round. The audience was described as not knowing which way the decision would go, until referee Eddie Graney gave it to Jimmy Britt.

First fight with Joe Gans
On 31 October 1904, Britt challenged World Lightweight Champion Joe Gans. The San Francisco Call said that "Gans was outboxed, outfought, and outgamed" by Britt. Britt fought on the offensive in the first round, but the punching was light in this round. The second round saw both fighting aggressively and throwing hard shots. The third round saw Britt take the lead with a straight right with the body early seriously hurting Gans. In the fourth round, Britt knocked Gans down, and Gans went down twice more, with Britt hitting Gans while still on the ground. In the fifth round, Britt sent Gans back, before the latter once again went down.  Britt struck Gans as he came up and was disqualified. The furious Britt then attacked the referee Eddie Graney

Series with Battling Nelson
On 20 December 1904, Britt fought his first of four fights with Battling Nelson. Britt won a decision after 20 rounds, outboxing Nelson despite being badly hurt multiple times by the Durable Dane, by keeping the fight at range and using his superior boxing science.

Nelson and Britt would once again fight on 9 September 1905. R. A. Smyth said Britt did not fight with his usual cleverness, and in the 18th round Nelson caught Britt with a light left, and then a right that sent Britt down until he was counted out.

Their third fight was held on 31 July 1907, with Britt winning another decision over the 20 rounds. The referee, Jack Welsh, said that Nelson only won two of the 20 rounds, and that "the rest of the time Britt outclassed him at every point".

Rematch with Gans and later career
Joe Gans announced his challenge to the winner of the third fight between Battling Nelson and Jimmy Britt in a speech before that fight. On 9 September 1907, Joe Gans and Jimmy Britt would once again fight for the World Lightweight Championship, however Britt was unable to repeat his success of the first fight. R. A. Smyth said, "Britt was hopelessly outclassed from the second round until the end came at the close of the fifth round." Britt quit after the end of the fifth round with an injury.  Britt was examined by multiple physicians, three of which diagnosed a fractured ulna, while Gans' physician said it was bruised.

Jimmy Britt would then fight a 10-round no-decision contest with Battling Nelson on 3 March 1908, with newspapers differing as to who was better.

Britt would then be stopped in the sixth round by Packey McFarland on 11 April 1908. After this he would have three fights with Johnny Summers in the United Kingdom, winning the first on decision in 1908, before losing a decision, and being knocked out in 1909.

Professional boxing record

All Newspaper decisions are regarded as “no decision” bouts as they have “resulted in neither boxer winning or losing, and would therefore not count as part of their official fight record."

References

External links
Britt's Record at Cyber Boxing Zone

Evening Independent Obituary
Milwaukee Journal Obituary

|-

1879 births
1940 deaths
Boxers from California
American male boxers
Lightweight boxers